Balmossie railway station is a small railway station at the border between Dundee and Angus which serves the east of Broughty Ferry and the west of Monifieth. ScotRail, who manage the station, operate all services.

History 
The station was originally opened on 18 June 1962 as Balmossie Halt by British Rail Scottish Region and renamed as Balmossie on 16 May 1983.

Facilities 
Facilities are very basic, comprising a bench on platform 2, and a shelter on platform 1. There is step-free access to both platforms, including via a ramped footbridge. There are no help points, which could be considered negligent for accessibility standards. As there are no facilities to purchase tickets, passengers must buy one in advance, or from the guard on the train.

Passenger volume 

The statistics cover twelve month periods that start in April.

Services 
British Rail operated local passenger services between Dundee and Arbroath until May 1990. Since these were discontinued, most of the intermediate stations have had only a very sparse "parliamentary" service, provided so as to avoid the difficulty of formal closure procedures. ScotRail provides Balmossie with only two trains a day in each direction, Mondays to Saturdays. The southbound services depart at 06:25 (to Dundee) and 08:01 (to Glasgow). The northbound services depart at 18:04 and 18:41, both to Arbroath. There is no Sunday service. As a result of the infrequent services and low population in the area, patronage of the station is low.

References

Bibliography

External links 

 Video footage of the station on YouTube

Railway stations in Angus, Scotland
Railway stations opened by British Rail
Railway stations in Great Britain opened in 1962
Railway stations served by ScotRail
1962 establishments in Scotland